The Great Run British Marathon Series is a series of long-distance running events organised by The Great Run Company taking place across the United Kingdom.

It currently comprises the Birmingham International Marathon in the Midlands and the Stirling Scottish Marathon in Scotland, with a third event yet to be announced.

Stirling Scottish Marathon 

The Stirling Scottish Marathon, supported by Scottish Athletics and Stirling Council, will take place on 21 May 2017. Starting west of the city at Blair Drummond Safari Park, the route will incorporate Stirlingshire countryside and landmarks including Doune Castle and Bridge of Allan before finishing beneath Stirling Castle.

Birmingham International Marathon 

The 2017 Birmingham International Marathon will take place in October 2017, on the same day as the existing Great Birmingham Run. The event will start at Alexander Stadium, home of UK Athletics, before taking in Bournville, Cannon Hill Park and Edgbaston, before finishing in the heart of the city centre.

Road running in the United Kingdom